The Cathedral of the Annunciation (or Blagoveschensky sobor) is a Russian Orthodox church dedicated to the Annunciation of the Theotokos. It is located on the southwest side of Cathedral Square in the Moscow Kremlin in Russia, where it connects directly to the main building of the complex of the Grand Kremlin Palace, adjacent to the Palace of Facets. It was originally the personal chapel for the Muscovite tsars, and its abbot remained a personal confessor of the Russian royal family until the early 20th century. Now it also serves as a part of Moscow Kremlin Museums.

History
The Cathedral of the Annunciation was built by architects from Pskov in 1484-1489 as part of Grand Duke Ivan III's plans for a large-scale renovation of the Moscow Kremlin. It was built on the spot of an older 14th-century cathedral of the same name, which had been rebuilt in 1416. This older cathedral in turn had replaced a previous wooden church from the 13th century that had fallen victim to the frequent fires in the Kremlin.

Construction work began using the existing foundations in 1484 and was completed in August 1489. A number of the early 15th-century icons were re-used in the new building. Due to its proximity to the palace, the church was chosen by Ivan III to be his personal chapel, and a staircase connecting the church directly to his personal chambers in the palace was constructed. Initially, today's Annunciation Cathedral had just three domes. After being badly damaged in a fire again in 1547, the then Grand Duke (and subsequently first Russian Tsar) Ivan the Terrible began a restoration of the church, which was completed in 1564. Two additional domes were added on the western side. The building was surrounded by parvises from three sides, and four single-cupola side chapels were built over the arched parvises, each with a dome, so that the cathedral is now a total of nine domes. In 1572, the cathedral received an additional staircase on its south facade, later called "Grosnenski"), named after Ivan the Terrible (Russian for "Ivan Grozny").

Many of the church treasures were lost during the occupation of Moscow by the armies of the Polish–Lithuanian Commonwealth in 1612 at the close of the Time of Troubles. It was also damaged by the great Kremlin fire of 1737. During the French occupation of Moscow in 1812, the cathedral was used as a barracks and was mostly robbed. It was restored in 1815–1820. During the 1917 Russian Revolution, the cathedral was damaged during the fighting. Afterwards, it was closed by the Bolshevik regime. During the 1950s, along with the other surviving churches in the Moscow Kremlin, it was preserved as a museum. After 1992, occasional religious services resumed, including a service on the Feast of the Annunciation, conducted by the Patriarch of Moscow. The church building underwent a restoration in 2009.

From the time of Ivan the Terrible's coronation as tsar, the members of the royal family worshiped at the Annunciation Cathedral, got married and baptized their children there. Even after the relocation of the capital to St. Petersburg, the Annunciation Cathedral remained one of the most important churches in Russia.

Architecture

Compared with the other two major Kremlin cathedrals, the Annunciation Cathedral has slightly smaller dimensions. It is also built in a more traditional style, as it was created by local architects from Pskov, rather than Italian expatriate architects. The most characteristic feature of the building is its nine golden domes, and roof with rich kokoshnik ornamentation in an ogive form.

The cathedral was built of brick, with facades of white limestone that are dressed and decorated. There are entrances to the cathedral on the eastern and the southern side of the building, with fretwork influenced by Italian Renaissance architecture. The bronze doors are decorated with gold foil. Tourists enter the cathedral via the eastern staircase, while the southern staircase is the one added in 1570 by Ivan the Terrible. The relatively high entrance is due to the fact that the building was built on the raised base of its predecessor.

The interior of the cathedral consists of the central prayer area and several surrounding galleries, with the additions of side altars in the 16th century. The northern (facing towards the Palace of Facets) is the first gallery space, which is entered through the visitor entrance. This contains a famous Image of Edessa icon, attributed to the famous Russian icon painter, Simon Ushakov. The gallery is separated by a doorway from the main room, created in the 16th century by Italian architects using a striking azure blue color with gilt floral ornaments. The door wings are decorated with figures of ancient poets and philosophers (including Diogenes, Euripides, Plato and Homer).

The main vault of the cathedral has a large iconostasis, which includes icons of the 14th to 17th centuries, including the ones painted by Andrei Rublev, Theophanes the Greek and Prokhor, and 19th century, as well, particular on the middle tiers. The fifth (lowest) row is pieced by a silver door, behind which is the old staircase to the Tsar's personal chambers.

Throughout the interior, there are fragments of murals painted by Theodosius (1508) and by others (second half of the 16th, 17th and 19th centuries). These include various biblical themes, heroic figures among other Russian princes and grand dukes. 

Also striking is the altar area of the floor, consisting of sheets of agate yellow-red jasper, which was brought from a cathedral in Rostov Velikiy in the 16th century and which may have originally come from Constantinople.

Behind the altar (where once the sacristy was located) a large silver reliquary containing the remains are of about 50 saints from different places in the Middle East was discovered in 1894.

References
Klein, Mina. The Kremlin: Citadel of History. MacMillan Publishing Company (1973). 
Tropkin, Alexander. The Moscow Kremlin: history of Russia's unique monument. Publishing House "Russkaya Zhizn" (1980). ASIN: B0010XM7BQ

External links

Official Home Page
 Satellite photo of the Cathedral of the Annunciation
 The Deesis Range of the Annunciation Cathedral
 The Church Feasts Range of the Annunciation Cathedral
 The article «“The Deesis painted by Andrey Rublev” from the Annunciation Church of the Moscow Kremlin» by Dr. Oleg G. Uliyanov
 A.S. Petrov The Reconstruction of the Tsar's “Place of Prayer” in the Annunciation Cathedral of the Moscow Kremlin

Religious buildings and structures completed in 1489
Cathedrals in Moscow
Moscow Kremlin
15th-century Russian Orthodox church buildings
Museums in Moscow
Religious museums in Russia
History museums in Russia
Art museums and galleries in Moscow
Archaeological museums in Russia
Religious organizations established in the 1480s
Church buildings with domes
Cultural heritage monuments of federal significance in Moscow